Physiotope is the total abiotic matrix of habitat present within any certain ecotope. The physiotope is the landform, the rocks and the soils, the climate and the hydrology, and the geologic processes which marshalled all these resources together in a certain way and in this time and place.

See also
 Ecological land classification

References
 Kratochwil, Anselm. Biodiversity in Ecosystems: Principles and Case Studies of Different Complexity Levels. Series: Tasks for Vegetation Science, XXXIV. Dordrecht, Germany: Kluwer Academic Publishers, 1999. .

Ecosystems
Ecology terminology
Habitat